Valende is the third album by the Italian psychedelic rock band Jennifer Gentle, released in 2005 by Sub Pop Records.

Track list
 Universal daughter
 I Do Dream You
 Tiny holes
 Circles of Sorrow
 The Garden pt.1
 Hessesopoa
 The Garden pt.2
 Golden drawings
 Liquid Coffee
 Nothing makes sense

References

Jennifer Gentle albums
2005 albums
Avant-pop albums